Dinotrux is a computer-animated web television series. It is based on Chris Gall's illustrated children's book series, which features a fictional prehistoric world inhabited by hybrid characters that are part reptile and part mechanical tool referred to as Reptools. The series debuted on August 14, 2015 on Netflix, while the second season was released on March 11, 2016, the third on October 7, 2016, the fourth on March 31, 2017, the fifth on August 18, 2017, the sixth on November 10, 2017, the seventh on March 23, 2018, and the eighth on August 3, 2018.

Series overview

Episodes

Season 1 (2015)
Set in the Mechazoic era of a prehistoric world populated by hybrid dinosaur-construction vehicles called Dinotrux, and hybrid reptile-tools called Reptools, Two best friends, Ty, a Tyrannosaurus Trux, and Revvit, a Reptool, must team up with other inhabitants of the world to defend their community and their work from an evil T-Trux, named D-Structs. It's time to 'Trux It Up'. The series premiered on August 14, 2015, when the first ten episodes were released.

Season 2 (2016)
The adventure continues with Ty, Revvit, and the rest of the Trux as they make new friends, new enemies and face all new challenges. With danger and mystery around every corner, these half-dinosaur, half-truck and all awesome friends will 'Trux It Up' to build a better world. 13 episodes of the second season were released on Netflix on March 11, 2016.

Season 3 (2016)
As the Dinotrux continue make their community bigger and better, new enemies come to challenge Ty, Revvit and the rest of their friends. But with bigger builds, new Dinotrux and Reptools soon to follow, these half-dinosaur, half-construction vehicle and all awesome friends are more determined than ever to build their way out of any situation. 16 episodes of the third season were released on Netflix on October 7, 2016.

Season 4 (2017)
With new trux, new locations and new responsibilities, Ty and the trux will have their work cut out for them, but nothing will stop these guys from protecting their community, battling the forces of evil and, most importantly, building a better world. So get ready for more action, new friends and new challenges, 'cause it's time to Trux it up!

Season 5 (2017)
Picking up where things left off from last season, Ty and the gang have dozens of new trux to transition into their ever-growing community, but nothing could have prepared him for the challenges ahead. Still, with his friends by his side and new dangers to contend with, Ty will always be ready to Trux it up, even against a new Trux that even he can't stop alone.

Season 6 (2017) Supercharged
Ty and the Trux are back and thanks to a hive of Superchargers, they're ready to have more Supercharged fun, build new Supercharged things and battle new Supercharged enemies. So prepare yourselves for some Supercharged action because it's time to Super-Trux it up!

Season 7 (2018) Supercharged
Ty and the gang find that things are getting easier with the use of Superchargers. But the challenges ahead will force them to use special Modifications in order to fight off New enemies and solve some truly unique problems, including rock climbing, racing and spy gadgets. Once again it's Time to Trux it up.

Season 8 (2018) Supercharged
After having been driven out of the crater by D-Structs, his bigger brother D-Stroy and their enslaved Dreadtrux Big Dread, Ty and the Gang now have to stage a rebellion from the Hidden Forest, living the lives of Renegades as they work together to liberate the crater from their enemies. These 13 episodes are the final ones released on the 3rd of August, 2018.

References

Lists of American children's animated television series episodes
Lists of Canadian children's animated television series episodes